Peter Esiri (born 11 September 1928) is a retired Nigerian athlete who represented Nigeria in the triple jump event at the 1956 Olympics held in Melbourne. Esiri  qualified for the final round in the event but overstepped the board in his attempts. He won a silver medal at the 1954 Commonwealth Games held in Vancouver.

References

1928 births
Living people
Nigerian male triple jumpers
Athletes (track and field) at the 1956 Summer Olympics
Olympic athletes of Nigeria
Athletes (track and field) at the 1954 British Empire and Commonwealth Games
Commonwealth Games silver medallists for Nigeria
Commonwealth Games medallists in athletics
20th-century Nigerian people
21st-century Nigerian people
Medallists at the 1954 British Empire and Commonwealth Games